95.9 Max FM (DXPF 95.9 MHz) is an FM station owned by Rizal Memorial Colleges Broadcasting Corporation and operated by Christian Media Management. Its studios and transmitter are located at J. Catolico Sr. Ave., General Santos. The frequency is formerly owned by Interactive Broadcast Media.

References

External links
Max FM Gensan FB Page

Radio stations in General Santos
Radio stations established in 2019